Italy competed at the 1959 Summer Universiade in Turin, Italy.

The 38 medals are the highest level of all-time for the Italy at the Universiade.

Medals

Details

References

External links
 Universiade (World University Games)
 WORLD STUDENT GAMES (UNIVERSIADE - MEN)
 WORLD STUDENT GAMES (UNIVERSIADE - WOMEN)

1959
1959 in Italian sport
Italy